Princess Jalila of Hejaz (1923–1955) was an Iraqi princess. She was the daughter of Ali, King of Hejaz, and Princess Nafeesa, sister of Crown Prince 'Abd al-Ilah, and the aunt of King Faisal II of Iraq.

Life

Her father was deposed in 1924, and she followed her family in exile to Iraq, were her uncle had been made king in 1921. 

Her brother 'Abd al-Ilah became regent of Iraq for their nephew king Faisal II in 1939. 

She married Sharif al-Hussein bin Ali bin Abdullah. 

In 1958, her brother, sister and the rest of the royal family were murdered in the massacre of the royal family during the 14 July Revolution.

References

 

20th-century Iraqi women
1923 births
1955 deaths
Iraqi princesses